Women in Love is a Canadian drama film, directed by Johanne Prégent and released in 1993. The film stars Louise Portal and Léa-Marie Cantin as Léa and Marianne, two friends who are about to turn 40, and are married to David (Kenneth Welsh) and Nino (Tony Nardi) respectively, but are both involved in extramarital affairs with other men due to their dissatisfaction with their marriages.

The cast also includes Sophie Lorain, David La Haye and Macha Limonchik.

Pierre Desrochers received a Genie Award nomination for Best Original Score at the 25th Genie Awards. The film was also in contention for the inaugural Claude Jutra Award for best first feature, but did not win.

References

External links

1993 films
1993 drama films
Canadian drama films
Quebec films
French-language Canadian films
1990s Canadian films